Al-Horjelah (also spelled Al-Horgelah or Al-Harjalah), is a Syrian village located in Markaz Rif Dimashq, Rif Dimashq. According to the Syria Central Bureau of Statistics (CBS), Al-Horjelah had a population of 3,550 in the 2004 census. The village also hosts a military base for the 4th Armoured Division.

Sports
The town is known for its football team, Al-Horgelah SC.

References 

Populated places in Rif Dimashq Governorate